This is a list of power stations in New Zealand. 

The list is not exhaustive – only power stations over 0.5 MW and significant power stations below 0.5 MW are listed.

Power plants in New Zealand have different generating roles – for baseload, intermediate or peaking. Baseload generators are those that run continuously (except for maintenance), and include all geothermal and run-of-the-river hydroelectric plants, which must 'use it or lose it'. Intermediate generators are load-following power plants. Peaking power plants generate only for minutes or hours at a time, during the sharpest peaks in electricity demand.

Bioenergy

Geothermal

Hydroelectric

Source:

Decommissioned hydroelectric

Heritage hydroelectric

Fossil-fuel thermal

Source:

Wind

Sources:

Solar

Grid battery storage

Proposed power stations

Source:

See also
Energy in New Zealand
Electricity sector in New Zealand
List of New Zealand spans
New Zealand electricity market

References

Further reading

External links 
 Identification of Potential Hydroelectric Resources - a report prepared for the Ministry of Economic Development in January 2004

 
New Zealand
Power stations in New Zealand